Heteroteuthis hawaiiensis is a species of bobtail squid native to the central and western Pacific Ocean. It occurs in waters off Hawaii, Bonin, the Ryukyu Islands, Indonesia, and the Great Australian Bight. H. hawaiiensis may also be present in Banc Combe in the southwestern Pacific at depths of 795 to 820 m.

H. hawaiiensis grows to approximately 30 mm in mantle length.

The type specimen was collected near Kauai in the Hawaiian Islands. It is deposited at the National Museum of Natural History in Washington, D.C.

References

External links 

Bobtail squid
Molluscs of the Pacific Ocean
Marine molluscs of Oceania
Molluscs of Hawaii
Molluscs described in 1909
Taxa named by Samuel Stillman Berry